Elizabeth "Beth" Comstock is an American business executive. She is a former vice chair of General Electric. She operated GE Business Innovations, which developed new businesses, markets and service models; drives brand value and partners to enhance GE's inventive culture. This unit includes GE Lighting, Current, GE Ventures & Licensing and GE sales, marketing and communications.

Personal life 
Comstock was born in Morgantown, West Virginia, to a schoolteacher mother and a dentist father. She is the oldest of three children. Her family moved to the Shenandoah Valley in Virginia where she spent her primary school years. Comstock graduated from The College of William and Mary in 1982 with a Bachelor of Science in biology and a minor in anthropology.

Career 
Realizing she "want[ed] to tell stories about science", Comstock interned at a public radio station, afterwards transitioning to local television reporting in Virginia and public-access television in Washington, D.C. She moved to NBC as a publicity coordinator in the mid-1980s.  After stints at CBS and Turner Broadcasting, she was brought back to NBC News for a turnaround project after a "fake news" scandal nearly collapsed the division. Based on this success, Comstock was recognized by Jack Welch and promoted to higher-level roles inside GE, which owned NBC at the time.

In 2003, Comstock began serving as GE's chief marketing and commercial officer, the first CMO in more than 20 years, and created Ecomagination in 2005 as an initiative to drive positive environmental impact from GE and its customers.  From 2006, she was President of Integrated Media at NBC Universal overseeing ad sales, marketing and research, and led the company's digital efforts including Peacock Equity, acquiring iVillage.com and oversaw the founding of Hulu.  Comstock was eventually promoted to Vice Chair of GE. In October 2017, she stepped down from this role to focus on new opportunities.

In Sept 2018, Comstock released her first book "Imagine It Forward: Courage, Creativity and the Power of Change".

Honors and achievements

 Comstock is a member of Nike, Inc's Board of Directors and Trustee president of the Cooper Hewitt, Smithsonian Design Museum.
 Forbes named Comstock one of "The World's 100 Most Powerful Women" in 2015  and 2016.
 On 29 October 2016, Comstock was listed by UK-based company Richtopia at number 8 in the list of 100 Most Influential Chief Marketing Officers.
 September 2018, Comstock named among PRWeek's "Top 20 Most Influential Communicators".

References 

College of William & Mary alumni
Living people
General Electric people
20th-century American businesspeople
20th-century American businesswomen
21st-century American businesspeople
21st-century American businesswomen
Businesspeople from Morgantown, West Virginia
Businesspeople from Virginia
Year of birth missing (living people)